Pritha garfieldi is a species of araneomorph spiders in the family Filistatidae.

Distribution 
This species is endemic to Tehran Province, Iran.

Description 
The male holotype measured 2.37 mm and the female paratype measured 4.48 mm.

Etymology 
This species was named after British-American actor Andrew Garfield, who has played the role of comic book superhero Spider-Man in three movies.

References 

Endemic fauna of Iran
Filistatidae
Spiders described in 2015
Spiders of Asia